David Roberto Hellman (28 May 1980 – 13 January 2006), known by his stage name Dave Lepard, was a Swedish singer, songwriter and musician. He is best known as the lead vocalist of glam metal band Crashdïet.

Career 

He formed the band Crashdïet in 2000 but in 2002, the band split up, and he continued with a new lineup. Their music was based on 1980s sleaze bands, such as Mötley Crüe and Twisted Sister, and the band gained a cult following, especially in Sweden.

Crashdïet released four singles from their debut album Rest in Sleaze which were hits in Sweden; "Riot in Everyone", "Breakin' the Chainz", "Knokk 'Em Down" and "It's A Miracle".

Death 

On 13 January 2006, 25-year-old Dave Lepard committed suicide by hanging himself in his apartment in Uppsala. His body was found on 20 January 2006. His three surviving bandmates performed a final tribute show the following February. They subsequently decided to remain together and by October 2007 the trio announced they would continue under the name Crashdïet, with the approval of Lepard's family, in tribute to Lepard. They eventually hired a new singer, H. Olliver Twisted.

References 

1980 births
2006 deaths
21st-century Swedish male singers
Glam metal musicians
Hard rock musicians
Male guitarists
Musicians from Stockholm
Suicides by hanging in Sweden
Swedish heavy metal guitarists
Swedish heavy metal singers
21st-century guitarists
Crashdïet members
2006 suicides